Partha Barua (born 3 May) is a Bangladeshi singer and actor. He is a member of the rock band Souls.

Early life
Barua was born and raised in Chittagong to Bimal Kanti Barua & Ava Barua. His mother was a teacher of Bagmoniram S.K City Corporation School. Barua was introduced to music at a very early age. He had a music teacher at home and also used to perform regularly at school programmes. He completed his SSC from Nasirabad Government High School and graduation from University of Chittagong.

Personal life 
Barua was married to Bangladeshi actress Ipshita Shabnam Srabanti. The couple divorced in 2009. He then later married Ranjana and they both have a daughter named Rupa Barua.

Musical career
While studying in Chittagong University, Barua sang for Sangskritik Chattro Sangha. Later, he became a member of a local band Message and began to learn playing guitar and keyboard. Partha started his singing career releasing his first music album with Souls in 1989.

Band

E Emon Porichoy (1993)

Aj Din Katuk Gane (1995)

Oshomoyer Gaan (1997)

Mukhorito Jibon (2000)

Tarar Uthone (2003)

To – Let  (2004)

Jhut Jhamela (2006)

Kingbodonti (2008)

Jam (2011)

Bondhu (2017)

Solo

Mukhosh (2020)

Duet

Other Notable Songs

Filmography

Television

Film

Web series

External links

References

Living people
Bangladeshi Buddhists
Year of birth missing (living people)
21st-century Bangladeshi male singers
21st-century Bangladeshi singers
20th-century Bangladeshi male singers
20th-century Bangladeshi singers
People from Chittagong
Bangladeshi composers
University of Chittagong alumni
Musicians from Chittagong